Amadou Sagna (born 10 June 1999) is a Senegalese professional footballer who plays as a forward for French  club Niort.

Club career
On 9 July 2019, Sagna signed with Belgian First Division A side Club Brugge. On 3 January 2020, Sagna signed with Oostende on loan for the rest of the 2019–20 season.

On 22 August 2020, Sagna made his professional debut for Club NXT, Brugge's reserve side in the Belgian First Division B. He started and played 85 minutes against RWDM47 as NXT were defeated 0–2.

On 26 May 2022, Club Brugge announced that Sagna had signed a permanent contract with Ligue 2 side Niort.

International career
On 13 May 2019, it was announced that Sagna would be part of the final Senegal squad for the 2019 FIFA U-20 World Cup. In the opening match against Tahiti, he scored after 9.6 seconds, the fastest ever goal in the competition's history. He ended the tournament with four goals, tied for second in the tournament, and won the Bronze Boot.

Career statistics

Club

Honours
International
Africa U-20 Cup of Nations runner-up: 2019

Individual
FIFA U-20 World Cup Bronze Boot: 2019

References

External links
Profile at the Club Brugge website

1999 births
Footballers from Dakar
Living people
Senegalese footballers
Association football forwards
Club Brugge KV players
Club NXT players
K.V. Oostende players
Stade Briochin players
Chamois Niortais F.C. players
Challenger Pro League players
Championnat National players
Championnat National 3 players
Senegalese expatriate footballers
Expatriate footballers in Belgium
Senegalese expatriate sportspeople in Belgium
Expatriate footballers in France
Senegalese expatriate sportspeople in France
Senegal youth international footballers